K. C. Venugopal (born 4 February 1963) is an Indian politician who is a Member of Parliament, Rajya Sabha elected from Rajasthan and former member of parliament in Lower House and is a member of the Indian National Congress. He has been appointed a General Secretary of AICC and in charge of Karnataka on 29 April 2017. Later, he was given additional charge of the general secretary of the organization. He was the Minister of State for Civil Aviation & Ministry of Power in the UPA Government.

Personal life 

K. C. Venugopal was born on 4 February 1963 to Kunjukrishnan Nambi and Janaki Amma in Payyanur, Kannur District of Kerala.

Political life 

He came to active politics through the Student Movement of the Indian National Congress. He became the State President of the Kerala Students Union and State President of the Indian Youth Congress, He was elected to the Kerala Legislative Assembly from Alappuzha Constituency in 1996, 2001 and 2006. He served as the Minister for Dewaswom and Tourism in the Oommen Chandy Ministry from 2004-06. He contested the General Elections to Loksabha from Alappuzha Constituency in 2009 and won with a good margin.

For Mr. Venugopal, Kannur has not been his political gravitational field ever since he politically relocated himself to Alappuzha following his election victory from the Alappuzha Assembly constituency in 1996. His success in the two Assembly elections in 2001 and 2006 and his election to the Lok Sabha in the 2009 Parliament election have only completed the process of his political expatriation.

However, he always kept in touch with his home district. The 56-year-old Congress leader, who served as Minister for Tourism and Devaswom in the United Democratic Front (UDF) government during 2004-06, began his political career when he was a student of the Payyanur College.

Since then he has been on the right trajectory of his political career in his party. From being a president of the Payyanur College unit of the Kerala Students Union (KSU) to his induction in the Union Cabinet, it was a long journey for a leader of his age. In between, he served as State President of the KSU (1987–92) and the Youth Congress (1992–2000), among others.

A post-graduate in mathematics, Venugopal owes his rapid political evolution to the late leader K. Karunakaran. His loyalty to the leader when the latter was at the helm of Congress affairs in the State helped him step on the political ladder without much ado. Venugopal was also a volleyball player during his college days. He played for the Payyanur College and the Calicut University.

Mr. Venugopal's supporters say that though he has moved to Alappuzha, he took a personal interest in various tourism projects in his home district when he was Tourism Minister. The Town Square, the renovated Gandhi Park at Payyanur, approval of the proposals for the development of beaches in the district, and the eco-tourism project for Paithalmala are some among them.

On 29 April 2017, he was chosen as general secretary of All India Congress Committee. He also was made in charge of Congress War Rooms in many elections. He was elected from Rajasthan as a Member of parliament Rajya Sabha on 19 June 2020.

Controversy 
In August 2022, the Central Bureau of Investigation (CBI) questioned Venugopal in connection with an alleged sexual exploitation case in the 2012 solar scam in Kerala.

References

External links 
 LS Biodata
 2009 Ele.

Living people
1963 births
Rajya Sabha members from Rajasthan
Indian National Congress politicians from Kerala
Lok Sabha members from Kerala
India MPs 2014–2019
People from Alappuzha district
Kerala MLAs 1996–2001
Kerala MLAs 2001–2006
Kerala MLAs 2006–2011